
Lake Hallwil (German: Hallwilersee) is a lake largely in the Canton of Aargau, Switzerland, located at . It is the largest lake in Aargau and lies mostly in the districts of Lenzburg and Kulm on the southern edge of the canton. The southern tip of the lake reaches into the canton of Lucerne. The main river leading to this lake is the Aabach, which is coming from the Lake Baldegg.

Its surface is approximately 10.3 km2 and its maximum depth is 48 metres. It is a popular vacation destination.

In 1938 Sir Malcolm Campbell set a world water speed record in Blue Bird K3 on the lake.

External links

Waterlevels of Lake Hallwil at Meisterschwanden
Profile of Lake Hallwil at schweizersee.ch

Lakes of Switzerland
Lakes of Aargau
Lakes of the canton of Lucerne
LHallwil